Danny Hoekman is a footballer who played as a midfielder in the Football League for Manchester City.

References

1964 births
Living people
Dutch footballers
Manchester City F.C. players
ADO Den Haag players
NEC Nijmegen players
VVV-Venlo players
English Football League players
Dutch football managers
K.R.C. Mechelen managers
Bonner SC managers
Mesaimeer SC managers
Al-Shahania Sports Club managers
Footballers from Nijmegen
Association football midfielders